The following is a list of notable events and releases of the year 1979 in Norwegian music.

Events

April
 6 – The 6th Vossajazz started in Voss, Norway (April 6 – 8).

May
 23
 The 27th Bergen International Festival started in Bergen, Norway (May 23 – June 6).
 The 7th Nattjazz started in Bergen, Norway (May 23 – June 6).

August
 26 – The 11th Kalvøyafestivalen started at Kalvøya near by Oslo.

Albums released

Unknown date

A
 Bjørn Alterhaug
 Moments (Arctic Records)

E
 Jan Eggum
 En Sang Fra Vest (CBS Records)
 En Natt Forbi (CBS Records)

K
 Egil Kapstad
 Til Jorden (ECM) with poems by Rolf Jacobsen.
 Karin Krog
 Cloud Line Blue (Bluebell Records), with John Surman

N
 Lillebjørn Nilsen
 Live At Sioux Falls South Dakota! (Skandisk Records), with Steinar Ofsdal
 Oslo 3 (Skandisk Records)

R
 Inger Lise Rypdal
 Inger Lise Rypdal (RCA Victor)
 Terje Rypdal
 Terje Rypdal / Miroslav Vitous / Jack DeJohnette (Zarepta Records)

S
 Øystein Sunde
 Hærtata Hørt (Philips Records)

T
Jahn Teigen
 En Dags Pause (RCA Victor)
 Klar Dag / Instamatik (RCA Victor)
 Mentalkrem (RCA Victor)
Radka Toneff
 It Don't Come Easy (Zarepta Records)

Deaths

 January
 28 – Elling Enger, composer (born 1905).

 March
 7 – Klaus Egge, composer and music critic (born 1906).

 April
 3 – Ernst Glaser, violinist, orchestra conductor and music teacher (born 1904).

 October
 24 – Trygve Lindeman, cellist and the head of the Oslo Conservatory of Music (born 1896).

Births

 January
 1 – Anders Danielsen Lie, actor, musician and medical doctor.
 4 – Audun Ellingsen, jazz upright bassist.
 24 – Anita Auglend, black metal singer (The Sins of Thy Beloved).

 February
 12 – Eth Eonel, singer, songwriter, and producer.

 March
 10 – Ragnhild Furebotten, fiddler, folk musician and composer
 24 – Jostein Hasselgård, pop singer.

 April
 2 – Stian Westerhus, jazz guitarist.
 12 – Thomas Dybdahl, singer/songwriter.
 20 – Kenneth Kapstad, prog rock drummer.
 25 – Martin Sjølie, pianist, songwriter and record producer.

 May
 4 – Magnus Loddgard, orchestra conductor, pianist and vocal coach.
 6 – Jan Erik Mikalsen, contemporary composer.
 8
 Alf Wilhelm Lundberg, jazz guitarist, pianist, and composer.
 Ole Morten Vågan, jazz upright bassist.
 16 – Hermund Nygård, jazz drummer and composer.
 22 – Christer-André Cederberg, music producer, mixer, audio engineer, and musician.

 June
 23 – Susanna Wallumrød, singer, pianist and composer.
 26 – Mathias Eick, Norwegian trumpeter.

 July
 8 – Noora Noor, neo soul singer.
 24 – Heidi Skjerve, jazz singer and composer.

 August
 1 – Bjørn Vidar Solli, jazz guitarist, vocalist, and composer.
 3 – Maria Haukaas Mittet, pop singer.
 10 – Ove Alexander Billington, jazz pianist and composer.

 October
 2 – Peter Espevoll, death metal vocalist (Extol).
 19 – Ingunn Ringvold, roots singer, musician and songwriter.
 14 – Marcus Paus, composer.

 December
 6 – Ørjan Matre, contemporary composer.
 10 – Tora Augestad, singer and actor.
 20 – Benedikte Shetelig Kruse,  singer and actor.
 27 – Hanne Sørvaag, singer and songwriter.

 Unknown date
 Espen Reinertsen, jazz saxophonist, flutist, and composer.
 Einar Selvik, black metal drummer (Gorgoroth).
 Robert Post, singer-songwriter.
 Sampda Sharma, singer and actress.
 Stein Urheim, jazz guitarist and composer.

See also
 1979 in Norway
 Music of Norway
 Norway in the Eurovision Song Contest 1979

References

 
Norwegian music
Norwegian
Music
1970s in Norwegian music